Antonio Francesco Frisi (21 January 1733 – 20 July 1817) was an Italian historian who wrote about the history of Monza.

Life

Frisi was born in Melegnano in 1733, his brother Paolo Frisi was an astronomer. He wrote from original documents and he is regarded as the first historian of Monza. He became a canon of Milan Cathedral in 1793. He is known for a three volume history Historical memories of Monza and his court which was published in 1794, and for his biography of Maria Gaetana Agnesi, Elogio storico di Donna Maria Gaetana Agnesi, written in 1799 in the year of Agnesi's death. He died in Milan in 1817.

References

1733 births
1817 deaths
People from Melegnano
18th-century Italian historians